A Hanoverian (German: Hannoveraner) is a Warmblood horse breed originating in Germany, which is often seen in the Olympic Games and other competitive English riding styles, and has won gold medals in all three equestrian Olympic competitions. It is one of the oldest, most numerous, and most successful of the Warmblood breeds. Originally a cavalry horse, infusions of more Thoroughbred blood lightened it to make it more agile and useful for competition. The Hanoverian is known for a good temperament, athleticism, beauty, and grace.

Breed history

In 1735, George II, the King of England and Elector of Hanover, founded the State Stud at Celle. He purchased stallions suitable for all-purpose work in agriculture and in harness, as well as for breeding cavalry mounts. The local mares were refined with Holsteiner, Thoroughbred and Cleveland Bay, Neapolitan, Andalusian, Prussian, and Mecklenburg stock. By the end of the 18th century, the Hanoverian had become a high-class coach horse.

In 1844, a law was passed that allowed only stallions approved by a commission to be used for the purpose of breeding. In 1867, breeders started a society aimed at producing a coach and military horse, with the first stud book being published in 1888. The Hanoverian became one of the most popular breeds in Europe for coach and army work.

When the demand for Hanoverians declined following World War I, the aim for breeding became a horse that could be used for farm work, but still had the blood and gaits to be used as a riding and carriage horse. After World War II, there was a growing demand for sport horses, as well as general riding horses, and the breeding yet again was adapted. Thoroughbreds were used to refine the breed; occasionally an Anglo-Arabian or Trakehner stallion was used. The key to the success of the Hanoverian has been the rigorous selection of breeding stock, a large breed population, and breeders' willingness to adapt to changes in demand.

Today, the Hanoverian breeders' association offers many incentives to breed the best, including the famous auctions at Verden, and extensive grading opportunities for stallions, mares and young horses. In addition, few breeds have such well-kept records, allowing breeders to trace bloodlines over many generations, improving their chances to find the best stallion–mare match. The current aim of breeders today is to create a noble, versatile warmblood with light, elastic, and ground-covering gaits. Outside blood is brought in to improve the breed from Thoroughbred, Arab, and approved European Warmblood registered breeding stock based on pedigree, competitive performance and inspection by the Hanoverian Society’s judges. The strict selection ensures that Hanoverians are athletic and good jumpers, for show jumping and eventing, and have the gaits for dressage.

Breed characteristics
Hanoverians are elegant, strong, and robust. They are bred to be willing and trainable, and have a strong back, powerful body, athletic movement, and strong limbs. Chestnut, bay, black, and gray are found the most often. Regulations prohibit horses with too much white, and buckskin, palomino and cremello horses from being registered.

Hanoverians in sport

The World Breeding Federation for Sport Horses (WBFSH) uses results from International Federation for Equestrian Sports-recognized (FEI) competitions to rank individual horses and breed registries within each Olympic discipline: dressage, show jumping, and eventing. The WBFSH publishes these rankings each year. The FEI is also the International Olympic Committee-recognized international governing body for equestrian sport.

In North America, the hunt seat style of riding features the show hunter, a highly competitive discipline. While infrastructure does not allow the accuracy and completeness of WBFSH/FEI standings, the United States Equestrian Federation (USEF) also publishes yearly rankings of the top hunter horses, and the top sires of hunter horses.

Hanoverians in dressage

The Hanoverian Society has been the most successful studbook in international dressage competition as ranked by the WBFSH and FEI since these standings began to be published in 2001. The top Hanoverian-branded international dressage horses include Salinero, Satchmo 78, Sunrise, Bonaparte 67, Brentina, and Wansuela Suerte. Since the 1956 Olympic Games, Hanoverians have earned 3 individual gold medals (Salinero twice, and Gigolo), 4 individual silver medals (Satchmo, Gigolo twice, and Woycek), and 4 individual bronze medals (Bonaparte, Weyden, Mehmed, and Dux). Hanoverians have been members of no fewer than 7 gold medal dressage teams (2008, 2004, 2000, 1996, 1992, 1976, 1968, and 1964). The World Equestrian Games, which are held every four years to split the non-Olympic years evenly, have also been won by many Hanoverians. Dressage champions at the World Equestrian Games that bore the Hanoverian brand include Mehmed (1974), Gigolo (1994, 1998), Satchmo (2006), and Salinero (2006, freestyle). Hanoverians have been members of 8 gold-medal winning WEG teams since 1966 (1966, 1974, 1978, 1982, 1990, 1994, 1998, and 2006). At the age of 25, the Hanoverian stallion Weltmeyer is the world's #3 sire of international-caliber dressage horses, behind #2 Donnerhall, who was sired by the Hanoverian Donnerwetter.

Hanoverians in show jumping
The Hanoverian Society has been consistently ranked in the top five most successful studbooks in international show jumping competition as ranked by the WBFSH and FEI since 2001. The best Hanoverian jumpers of the new millennium are Shutterfly, by Silvio, and For Pleasure, by Furioso II. Shutterfly won the Show Jumping World Cup in 2005, 2008, and 2009. For Pleasure was second place at the 1995 World Cup, and was a member of two gold medal-winning Olympic show jumping teams. Warwick Rex won the individual gold medal in show jumping at the 1976 Montreal Olympics, and Fidelitas took silver at the 1964 Tokyo Games. Hanoverians have been members of 6 Olympic gold medal teams in show jumping (2000, 1996, 1992, 1988, 1964, 1960). Other top-notch Hanoverian show jumpers include winner of the 1995 World Cup Dollar Girl, two-time World Cup champion E.T. FRH, and Esprit FRH, vice-champion of the World Cup in 1998 and member of the gold medal-winning show jumping team at the 1998 World Equestrian Games in Rome.

Hanoverian show hunters

Show hunters are subjectively judged over at least two separate patterns of rustic obstacles, and are also judged on the efficiency and correctness of their gaits. Conformation hunters are also judged on their conformation, or the suitability and correctness of their physique. Over fences, hunters must jump safely and predictably, pulling their legs away from the obstacle and using their hindquarters for propulsion. The best hunters are pleasant and uncomplicated to ride. Competitions for show hunters are uncommon outside the United States and Canada. These competitions are broken down based on the age and presumed ability level of the rider: "juniors" are riders under the age of 18, and they are divided into those riders 15 years old and younger, and those that are 16 or 17. Amateur adult riders compete in divisions for those 18 to 35 years, and those over 35. Champion hunters with the Hanoverian brand from recent years include Renaissance, Regular Working Hunter Horse of the Year in 2008, Katcha' Lookin', who was nationally ranked in top ten Regular Working Hunters in 2007, 2006, and 2005, and Sequel, Regular Working Hunter Horse of the Year in 2006 and 2005. Horse of the Year titles have also gone to Hanoverians in the restricted divisions, such as Large Junior Hunter 16-17 in 2008, Amateur Owner Hunter 18-35 and Amateur Owner Hunter 35+ in 2006, and Green Conformation Hunter in 2006. While poor record-keeping on the part of sellers and buyers limits their potential accuracy, the United States Equestrian Federation also publishes annual rankings of sires of hunter horses. In 2008, four Hanoverian sires were ranked in the top 10: All the Gold (2), Rio Grande (4), Escudo I (5) and Espri (8).

Hanoverians in eventing
The sport of eventing is descended from comprehensive tests of cavalry horses, which had to be able to cover uncertain terrain and obstacles at speed, while still highly trained and obedient. The latter aspect is tested with a dressage test, while a grueling day of cross country jumping and galloping, followed by a simple show jumping course the next day, test the former quality. As civilians took up the sport following World War I, the sport began to demand faster horses. Over time, Hanoverians have become more successful in eventing. The development of the "short format" event, which does not require as much galloping, as well as the efforts of a handful of Hanoverian breeders, have seen the breed advance in the sport. An especially influential breeder of Hanoverian eventers is Friedrich Butt, whose crossing of Hanoverian half-Thoroughbred mares back to Thoroughbred stallions has produced the likes of Butts Abraxxas and the full siblings Butts Leon and Butts Leoness. Both Abraxxas and Leon were members of the gold medal-winning eventing team at the 2008 Beijing Olympics.

In 2008, the World Breeding Federation for Sport Horses (WBFSH) ranked the Hanoverian studbook third for eventing horses, behind the Irish Sport Horse and Selle Français. Thoroughbreds actually dominate the sport, and unregistered part-Thoroughbreds are also common, but as the breed registries for the Thoroughbred do not declare sport horses as their breeding aim, they are not members of the WBFSH and thus are not part of these rankings. Top sires of international-caliber Hanoverian eventers include Heraldik xx, Thoroughbred sire of Butts Leon and Butts Abraxxas; Amerigo Vespucci xx, Thoroughbred sire of Air Jordan and Nebelwerfer; Lemon xx, Thoroughbred sire of Lady Lemon FRH and FRH Little Lemon; and Sherlock Holmes xx, Thoroughbred sire of Schorsch and FRH Serve Well.

Health concerns
In order to be incorporated into the studbook, stallions and mares must pass rigorous testing. The goal of this testing is to prevent horses with heritable defects from continuing to pass on their genes. As a result, horses with the Hanoverian brand often have excellent health. The Hanoverian verband, and other warmblood breeding societies, continue to promote research into the health of their horses.

Poor fertility in Hanoverian stallions and mares is not very common. However, research on Hanoverian stallions has helped lead to the identification of new genes that affect stallion fertility.

Osteochondrosis is a disease that affects the bone and cartilage in the joints of growing horses. The joints most commonly affected are the fetlocks in the fore- and hind leg, and the hock and stifle of the hind leg. Osteochondrosis lesions include tiny fractures, fluid buildup, loose flaps of cartilage, or chips of cartilage loose within the joint. The last lesion is called osteochondrosis dissecans (OCD), and can develop further into degenerative joint disease, such as osteoarthrosis. Osteochondrosis can also contribute to navicular syndrome and Wobbler disease. Because most horses, especially Hanoverians, which are often used for demanding equestrian sports, work for a living, joint discomfort can mean the end of a horse's career. Between 7% and 10% of Hanoverians have OCD in the hock joint, and between 12% and 24% have OCD in a fetlock joint.

Recent research has tagged certain conformational characteristics and other heritable factors of bone growth and maintenance as the most important contributors to the development of osteochondrosis. The Hanoverian Breeder's Society in Germany, and all its daughter societies, mandate that stallions must be free of OCD lesions in order to be issued a breeding license. Elite mares and Verband-sponsored auction candidates have identical requirements. Horses are examined with radiographs.

Breed societies
The first studbook—official documentation of pedigrees, matings, and ensuing offspring—for Hanoverians was founded in 1888 by the Royal Agricultural Society. The "Hanoverian Warmblood studbook" was kept by the Chamber of Agriculture from 1899 until 1922, when the Society of Hanoverian Warmblood Breeders was founded, privatizing ownership of the studbook. This society unified over 50 local breeders' clubs with a total of over 10,000 members. Today, this society is known simply as the Hannoveraner verband, or Hanoverian Society. The verband maintains the studbooks, issues passports, and collects and publishes performance statistics, while educating members about and encouraging research into all aspects of breeding and keeping healthy Hanoverians.

The Association for the Promotion of Hanoverian horses in Equestrian Sport (Verein zur Förderung des Reitsports auf Hannoverschen Pferden) was founded in 1985 and operates under the verband. Its goal is to unite sponsors, corporate or otherwise, and talented riders with the most gifted Hanoverian horses. In this way, the FRH removes the most common obstacle to a horse's success: expense. Horses united with their riders in this fashion bear the initials FRH as a suffix or prefix, e.g. Gigolo FRH, FRH Butts Abraxxas, Forsyth FRH.

The popularity of the Hanoverian has brought about a number of affiliated societies as Hanoverian horses began to reach the Americas, Australia and New Zealand in the 1970s. The American Hanoverian Society was founded in 1978.  A single society first served Australia and New Zealand in 1981; the two nations have had separate societies since 1993. There are two Hanoverian breeding clubs in Canada, in addition to groups in the United Kingdom, Denmark, Finland, France, and Russia.

Verband activities
The verband is responsible for many events and facilities related to the Hanoverian horse, including selection procedures for breeding stock and the famous Elite Auctions in Verden. The verband also owns the Hanoverian Riding and Driving School which trains riders, instructors, and horses.

Auctions
The auctions in Verden were first held in 1949, and have been held at the Niedersachsenhalle venue since 1972. There are at least ten auctions per year, each featuring top-quality riding horses, promising foals, proven broodmares, or licensed stallions. The most famous of these sales are the Elite Riding Horse Auctions held in April and October each year. World Cup winners such as Aramis, Mr. T and Walk on Top were Verden Elite Auction horses. Horses are delivered to the venue four weeks prior to the auction for training, promotion, and thorough screening for radiographic irregularities and vices. Price toppers routinely sell for well over €100,000 (Euros). The record price of €900,000—approximately equal to $1,125,000 at the time—was set in 2008 for the purchase of Lemony's Nicket.

Mare and foal shows
The many steps and careful evaluations of Hanoverian breeding stock are organized by the verband and district breeders' clubs (bezirkverband). The district clubs are primarily responsible for local mare and foal shows. Foals of that year are presented, usually at their dam's side, to a panel of licensed breed judges. Foals of acceptable quality are branded, their papers are signed, and they are entered into the foal registry. Judges also use this venue to recommend exceptional foals for stallion candidacy or auction participation. Mares return to the mare shows as three-year-olds to be evaluated for entry into the studbook; only such mares can have registered Hanoverian foals. The young mares are evaluated on their conformation and gaits to ensure that they are of sufficient quality. Another component of the mare shows is the field test, in which young mares are evaluated for their suitability for and age-appropriate competency in dressage and show jumping. The majority of young mares participate in the field test or station test for mares, as proof of performance is required for the mother of any stallion candidate, as well as for the State's Premium. The best mares are awarded the State's Premium (Staatspraemie), a monetary prize provided by the government of Lower Saxony aimed at keeping the finest mares in the local breeding population. Every other year, one of the seven district breeders' clubs hosts the Louis Wiegels show. The best three- and four-year-old mares from each district attend, and to win is a great honor. Alternating years with the Louis Wiegels Mare show, the verband hosts the Herwert von der Decken mare show in Verden.

Breeding stock selection events
Each year, the seven regional clubs nominate a total of 700 two-year-old colts as stallion candidates, of which only 100 attend the actual licensing (koerung) at Verden in October. A panel of verband-selected judges, experts in their fields, form the koerkommission, which evaluates each young stallion for his suitability as a sire of future Hanoverians. Through a veterinary exam, the colts must be deemed free of osteochondrosis lesions, vices, and other heritable conditions. They are then assessed on pavement to ensure that they have sound, straight, true gaits, as well as straight, sound legs. On the second day, the colts are judged on the suitability of their gaits for dressage, and their competency in jumping. On the third day, about half of the young stallions will have earned their temporary breeding license, while the other half are typically castrated and go on to become excellent riding horses. What follows the announcement of licensed stallions is the Stallion Sale, an auction which featured Hotline in 2005, who sold for a staggering €800,000.

The Hanoverian Society also organizes the Station Tests for mares. These four-week-long tests are a more in-depth evaluation of a mare's suitability for riding; in addition to her talents for dressage or show jumping, the judges can form an understanding of her character and temperament, including how easy she is to train. These tests are held at the Hanoverian Riding and Driving School in Verden and at the Hessen State Stud in Dillenburg. After young stallions have earned their temporary license, they have until they are four years old to prove themselves serviceable riding horses. The most common track is to send the stallion to a Stallion Performance Test (Hengstleistungsprüfung) at the test center in Adelheidsdorf. As an outpost of Celle State Stud, the test center, unlike the Riding and Driving School, is owned by the state. Management of the 11-month test for state-owned stallions and the 70-day test for privately owned stallions is shared between the government-owned State Stud and the privately owned Hanoverian Society.

References

External links

 The Hanoverian Verband
 American Hanoverian Society
 British Hanoverian Society
 The Hanoverian Society of New Zealand
 http://www.hanoverian.com/

 
Horse breeds
Horse breeds originating in Germany
Warmbloods